Saýat District   is a district of Lebap Province in Turkmenistan. The administrative center of the district is the town of Saýat.

Found in January 1925 with the same name in Lenin Province (today Lebap), it became directly subordinate to the Turkmen SSR government following the abolishment of Chardzhuyskiy in September 1930.

In November 1939, it became part of the then newly formed Chardzhou Province before its province's dissolution in January 1963, twenty-four years later.

It rejoined Chardzhou again in December 1970, where it remains in place until 2017, where the Turkmen parliament absorbed the district into Sakar.

References

Districts of Turkmenistan
Lebap Region